Rank comparison chart of officer ranks for armies/ land forces of Oceania states.

Officers

See also
Comparative army officer ranks of the Americas
Ranks and insignia of NATO armies officers

References

Military comparisons